David Gray (August 8, 1870 – April 11, 1968) was an American playwright and novelist, who served as the United States minister to Ireland from 1940 to 1947.

Early years
Gray was born in Buffalo, New York, and graduated from Harvard University in 1892. He was a member of the American Expeditionary Forces in World War I; serving in France, he received the Croix de guerre and the Legion of Honour. In 1925, he received a Doctor of Letters from Bowdoin College.

Minister to Ireland
Gray was appointed minister to Ireland in February 1940, and presented his credentials in April 1940. His official title was Envoy Extraordinary and Minister Plenipotentiary.

In Gray's own words, his appointment was nepotic, as he was First Lady's  Eleanor Roosevelt's uncle through marriage.  Gray was in his post through most of World War II and the start of the Cold War. He led American efforts to convince Ireland to enter the war on the side of the Allies. His performance was such that Ireland's Taoiseach (prime minister) Éamon de Valera sought repeatedly to have Gray replaced, especially after the death of Franklin D. Roosevelt. Gray believed Ireland was only staying neutral because de Valera actually believed the Nazis would eventually defeat the Allies.  He also believed that top Irish officials were colluding with Nazi Germany secretly.

Views on Ireland
As a Roosevelt family member, Gray wrote privately to Franklin and Eleanor Roosevelt with a number of dry verses and remarks, sometimes humorous and sometimes scathing, on his opinions of de Valera and Irish policy towards the War.

Senior lecturer in U.S. Foreign Policy, Timothy J. Lynch, has observed that "his animus towards his host nation made Gray atypical of American ambassadors in Dublin."

Gray, among other things, relied for guidance on seances conducted at the embassy residence, according to T. Ryle Dwyer, author of a number of publications on Irish neutrality.  During World War II, Gray was completely at odds with the OSS in Ireland.  Gray believed the Irish government was secretly pro-Nazi. Gray consistently tried to get Ireland to join the war against the Nazis, though Ireland refused. De Valera went so far as to ask the United States government and Franklin Roosevelt to remove Gray from his post because of opposition to Irish neutrality, though the U.S. government never did.

In popular culture
The character of David Gray was played in the 1983 RTÉ television series Caught in a Free State by the actor O. Z. Whitehead.

Later years
Gray donated many of his personal papers to the Franklin D. Roosevelt Presidential Library before his death, including an extensive correspondence. Gray died in Florida in 1968, aged 97.

Works

References

Further reading

External links
David Gray papers at the University of Wyoming - American Heritage Center

Ambassadors of the United States to Ireland
1870 births
1968 deaths
Harvard University alumni